Stringin' Along with Chet Atkins is the name of two albums:

Stringin' Along with Chet Atkins (1953 album)
Stringin' Along with Chet Atkins (1955 album)